Lazzaretti is an Italian surname.

Notable people with this surname include:
 David Lazzaretti (1834–1878), Italian preacher
 Gustavo Lazzaretti (born 1984), Brazilian footballer
 Rob Lazzaretti (born: ?), American artist
 Romolo Lazzaretti (1895–1976), Italian cyclist